O Emmanuel is a 2016 Adventide album composed by J.J. Wright and performed by the Notre Dame Children's Choir, Fifth House Ensemble, and Wright himself. The album is a mix various genres of sacred music, including traditional choral music, gregorian chant, gospel, and sacred jazz.

Composition 
O Emmanuel was composed by J.J. Wright while pursuing a doctoral degree at the University of Notre Dame, while he was an intern for the Sistine Chapel Choir in Rome and studying abroad at the Pontifical Institute of Sacred Music in Rome. Speaking with Catholic News Agency, Wright described the composition's music as an authentic description of his own Catholic faith, and described the album's composition as an attempted mixture of musical traditions native to the United States with the sacred music traditions of Western Europe. In doing so, his music on the album took inspiration from the spirit of Sacrosanctum Concilium, a document produced during the Second Vatican Council that stated that a suitable place be given to the various musical traditions of the world within the context of religious life. The particular songs Wright chose to compose for the album itself were inspired by O Antiphons, Christian prayers sung by Catholics in the final week of Advent during vespers.

Recording 
The album was recorded at the DeBartolo Performing Arts Center in Notre Dame, Indiana. The album, produced by Thomas Moore with sound engineer Robert Friedrich, was performed by the Notre Dame Children's Choir and four adult vocalists, alongside the Chicago-based Fifth House Ensemble and Wright, who performs as part of his jazz trio.

Track listing

Reception 
Upon its release, O Emmanuel shot to the top of the Billboard Traditional Classical Albums chart, a place where it would spend the next eight weeks. Reviews of the album were generally positive. Mary Kunz Goldman, writing in The Buffalo News, described the song's charting as "impressive" in light of the album's fusion of jazz with gregorian chant.

References

External links 

 

Jazz albums by American artists
Christian music albums by American artists
2016 albums